is a Japanese footballer who plays for Fujieda MYFC.

Club statistics
Updated to 23 February 2016.

References

External links

Profile at Fujieda MYFC 

1992 births
Living people
Kwansei Gakuin University alumni
Association football people from Shizuoka Prefecture
Japanese footballers
J3 League players
Japan Football League players
SP Kyoto FC players
Fujieda MYFC players
Association football defenders